Reinhold is a prominent lunar impact crater that lies to the south-southwest of the crater Copernicus, on the Mare Insularum. It was named after 16th century German astronomer and mathematician Erasmus Reinhold. To the southwest is the slightly smaller crater Lansberg.

The interior walls are terraced and the irregular outer ramparts are visible against the flat surface of the mare. The interior floor is relatively featureless, with only a few low rises. Just to the northeast is a low, flooded crater designated Reinhold B.

Satellite craters
By convention these features are identified on current lunar maps by placing the letter on the side of the crater midpoint that is closest to Reinhold.

References

External links

Related articles
 
 

Impact craters on the Moon